If You Don't, I Will is a 2014 French comedy film directed by Sophie Fillières. The film had its premiere in the Panorama section of the 64th Berlin International Film Festival.

Cast
 Emmanuelle Devos as Pomme 
 Mathieu Amalric as Pierre
 Anne Brochet as Sonja 
 Joséphine de La Baume as Mellie 
 Nelson Delapalme as Romain 
 Julia Roy as Simone 
 David Clark as John 
 Laurent Poitrenaux as Marouani 
 Anthony Paliotti as "La mort" 
 Alexandre Pous as Tom

References

External links
 

2014 films
2014 comedy films
French comedy films
2010s French-language films
2010s French films